"I Got You" is a song co-written and recorded by American country music artist Craig Morgan.  It was released in December 2005 as the third and final single from Morgan's album My Kind of Livin', reaching a peak of number 12 on the U.S. Billboard Hot Country Songs charts and number 92 on the Billboard Hot 100.  The song was written by Morgan, Phil O'Donnell and Tim Owens.

Background and writing
Craig states that he wrote "I Got You" while on tour with Keith Urban, hoping to persuade Urban to record the song; however, upon recording the demo version of the song, Morgan decided that the song was a perfect fit for his own style, and that he should record it instead of Urban.

Music video
The music video was directed by Wes Edwards and premiered in early 2006. It features Morgan and his band performing the song in a warehouse, while scenes of love and small-town life are projected on a screen behind him.

Chart positions

Year-end charts

References

2005 singles
2005 songs
Craig Morgan songs
BBR Music Group singles
Music videos directed by Wes Edwards
Songs written by Craig Morgan
Songs written by Phil O'Donnell (songwriter)
Songs written by Tim Owens